Lagenandra is a genus of flowering plants in the family Araceae. It is endemic to the Indian Subcontinent (Bangladesh, Sri Lanka, and India). The genus is similar to Cryptocoryne, but can be distinguished from it by its involute vernation. Cryptocoryne on the other hand exhibit convolute vernation.

Description
Helophytes, rarely rheophytes, with thick creeping rhizome; leaf blade simple, ovate to almost linear, fine venation transverse-reticulate; spathe tube with connate margins; spadix entirely enclosed in spathe tube; flowers unisexual, perigone absent. Differs from Cryptocoryne in having female flowers spirally arranged (pseudo-whorl in Lagenandra nairii, whorled in Lagenandra gomezii) and free; spathe tube "kettle" with connate margins (containing spadix) occupying entire spathe tube; spathe blade usually opening only slightly by a straight or twisted slit; berries free, opening from base; leaf ptyxis involute.

Species
Accepted species are as follows. A key to the species described before 1986 was provided by Crusio and de Graaf.
 Lagenandra bogneri de Wit - Sri Lanka
 Lagenandra dewitii Crusio & de Graaf - Sri Lanka
 Lagenandra erosa de Wit - Sri Lanka
 Lagenandra gomezii (Schott) Bogner & Jacobsen - Bangladesh
 Lagenandra jacobseni de Wit - Sri Lanka
 Lagenandra keralensis Sivadasan & Jaleel - Kerala
 Lagenandra koenigii (Schott) Thwaites - Sri Lanka
 Lagenandra lancifolia (Schott) Thwaites - Sri Lanka
 Lagenandra meeboldii (Engler) C.E.C. Fischer - southwestern India
 Lagenandra nairii Ramamurthy & Rajan - southwestern India
 Lagenandra ovata (L.) Thwaites - southwestern India, Sri Lanka
 Lagenandra praetermissa de Wit & Nicolson - Sri Lanka
 Lagenandra thwaitesii Engler - Sri Lanka
 Lagenandra toxicaria Dalzell - southwestern India
 Lagenandra undulata Sastry - Assam

References

 
Araceae genera
Flora of the Indian subcontinent
Taxa named by Nicol Alexander Dalzell